Go Soeda, the 2008 champion, tried to defend his title, but retired due to fatigue in the first round match against Yuichi Ito. 
Uladzimir Ignatik won the tournament after beating Tatsuma Ito 7–6(7), 7–6(3) in the final match.

Seeds

Draw

Finals

Top half

Bottom half

References
 Main draw
 Qualifying draw

Singles